The 2022 Scottish Challenge Cup final, also known as the SPFL Trust Trophy final for sponsorship reasons, was a football match that took place on 3 April 2022 between Raith Rovers and Queen of the South. It was the 29th final of the Scottish Challenge Cup since it was first organised in 1990 to celebrate the centenary of the now defunct Scottish Football League, and the seventh since the SPFL was formed. It was the first final played since 2019, as the 2020 final and the 2020–21 competition were cancelled due to the COVID-19 pandemic.

Route to the final

The competition is a knock-out tournament and was contested by 50 teams from Scotland in 2021–22. In previous years clubs from England, Wales, Northern Ireland and the Republic of Ireland have competed, but the competition was restricted to Scottish clubs in 2021–22 to reduce unnecessary travel during the COVID-19 pandemic.

Raith Rovers
As a 2020–21 Scottish Championship club, Raith Rovers were given a bye to the second round.

Queen of the South
As a 2020–21 Scottish Championship club, Queen of the South were given a bye to the second round.

Match details

References

Scottish Challenge Cup Finals
Scottish Challenge Cup Final 2022
Scottish Challenge Cup Final 2022
Challenge Cup Final
3
Scottish Challenge Cup Final